Mohammed Faraj Abdullah Al Rawahi (born 26 April 1993), commonly known as Mohammed Faraj, is an Omani footballer who plays for Oman Club in the Oman Professional League. He was capped 15 times for Oman.

Personal life
Mohammed's younger brother, Ahmed Al-Rawahi is a professional goalkeeper who has represented Oman U-23 in various tournaments and is playing for Oman Professional League side, Al-Nasr S.C.S.C.

Club career
He played for Samail Club from 2008 to 2010 in the first division league of Oman Football Association. In 2010, he signed a contract with Al-Seeb Club and played with them for two consecutive seasons. On 18 July 2013, he signed a two-years contract with Dhofar S.C.S.C.

On 6 July 2015, he signed a one-year contract with Al-Buraimi-based Al-Nahda Club. In the 2015–16 Oman Professional League, Mohammed came into the limelight soon after scoring a wonder goal on 26 December 2015 in a 2–3 loss against Omani giants, Dhofar S.C.S.C.

He first moved out of Oman in August 2016 to Spain where on 2 September 2016, he signed a one-year contract with Girona-based Girona FC B. He made his club debut on 6 November 2016 in a 2–1 loss against UE Vic and scored his first goal on 18 January 2017 in a 2–2 draw against Unió Atlètica d'Horta. He scored 3 goals in 22 appearances in the 2016–17 Primera Catalana.

After a successful stint in Spain, he moved back to Oman and signed a one-year contract with his former club, Al-Nahda.

International career
Mohammed is part of the first team squad of the Oman national football team. He was selected for the national team for the first time in 2016. He made his first appearance for Oman on 24 March 2016 in a 2018 FIFA World Cup Qualification match against Guam.

He has also represented Oman at both the U-17 and U-23 levels. He made four appearances in the inaugural AFC U-22 Championship in 2013.

References

External links

Mohammed Al-Rawahi at FEDERACIÓ CATALANA DE FUTBOL

Mohammed Al-Rawahi at YouTube

1993 births
Living people
People from Muscat, Oman
Omani footballers
Omani expatriate footballers
Oman international footballers
Association football defenders
Al-Seeb Club players
Dhofar Club players
Al-Nahda Club (Oman) players
Al-Wakrah SC players
Al-Shamal SC players
Girona FC B players
Oman Club players
Oman Professional League players
Qatari Second Division players
Expatriate footballers in Spain
Expatriate footballers in Qatar
Omani expatriate sportspeople in Spain
Omani expatriate sportspeople in Qatar
2019 AFC Asian Cup players
Footballers at the 2014 Asian Games
Asian Games competitors for Oman
Primera Catalana players